Dennis Walker or Denis Walker may refer to:

 Dennis Walker (footballer) (1944–2003), English footballer
 Dennis Walker (swimmer) (1913–1984), Canadian swimmer
 Denis Walker (born 1933), Rhodesian politician
 Denis Walker (activist) (1946–2017), Aboriginal Australian activist

See also
Walker (surname)